Sandusky House may refer to:

in the United States (by state then city)
Sandusky House (Carlisle, Kentucky), listed on the Bourbon County
Burnside-Sandusky Gothic House, St. Joseph, Missouri, listed on the NRHP in Buchanan County 
Thompson-Brown-Sandusky House, St. Joseph, Missouri, listed on the NRHP in Buchanan County
Sandusky County Jail and Sheriff's House, Fremont, Ohio, listed on the NRHP in Sandusky County
Sandusky House (Lynchburg, Virginia), listed on the NRHP